American singer Cyndi Lauper has released eleven studio albums, six compilation albums, five video albums and fifty-two singles. Worldwide, Lauper has sold approximately 50 million albums, singles and DVDs. According to RIAA, She has sold 8.5 million certified albums in the United States with She's so Unusual being her biggest seller (6× Platinum as of 1997).

Lauper was a founding member of Blue Angel, who released their debut album in 1980 on Polydor Records. The album was unsuccessful, causing the band to break up and Lauper to file for bankruptcy. In 1983, Lauper obtained a contract with Portrait Records, and her debut solo album, She's So Unusual, was released. The album was a major success, achieving platinum and gold certification around the world and spawning the hits "Girls Just Want to Have Fun", "Time After Time", "All Through the Night (Jules Shear song)" and "She Bop". In 1985, Lauper released "The Goonies 'R' Good Enough", a single from the soundtrack to The Goonies, and her second album, True Colors, was released in 1986. True Colors was another successful album, along with the single of the same name and "Change of Heart". A starring role in the film Vibes in 1988 led to the release of "Hole in My Heart (All the Way to China)", which was a hit in Australia and New Zealand. Lauper's third album, A Night to Remember, was released in 1989. This album was less successful, despite the popularity of the first single, "I Drove All Night". The following single, "My First Night Without You" managed to chart in the top 60 in the United States.

In 1992, Lauper appeared in the English version of Starmania, a French rock opera. She released a single from the musical, "The World Is Stone", which was a major hit in several countries, particularly France. Her album Hat Full of Stars was released in 1993 on Epic Records, attaining gold certification in France and Japan. Lauper's greatest hits compilation, Twelve Deadly Cyns...and Then Some, was released in 1994, with the re-recorded version of "Girls Just Want to Have Fun" reaching number four in the United Kingdom and New Zealand. A compilation of Lauper's music videos and an interview was released at the same time on VHS. In 1996, she released Sisters of Avalon, and an original album of Christmas songs, Merry Christmas...Have a Nice Life in 1998. These two albums were much less successful internationally than her previous releases, but both charted in Japan. Sisters of Avalon was also certified platinum in Japan.

In 2001, Lauper planned to release another album, Shine, but the record company folded. An extended play version of the album was released to counter Internet piracy, and the full album was released exclusively in Japan in 2004. In 2003, Lauper released her seventh studio album, At Last, and a live version in 2004 on DVD, Live... At Last. At Last is a set of covers that reinvent classic songs, such as the title track "At Last", "Walk On By" and "Stay". The live DVD achieved gold certification in the United States. In 2005, Lauper released The Body Acoustic, featuring new acoustic versions of her hits, such as a duet of "Time After Time" with Sarah McLachlan. Lauper's 2008 album, Bring Ya to the Brink, was her first release in seven years containing original material, and met with considerable success. In December 2008 she recorded the duet "A Christmas Duel" with Swedish pop band The Hives, released in Sweden only, where it reached number 4.  Memphis Blues, was released in 2010. It managed to be her highest-charting album on the Billboard 200 since True Colors in 1986, spending 13 consecutive weeks at number-one on the Billboard Blues chart, becoming the highest selling blues album of the year. So far, it has sold 600,000 copies worldwide. Her most recent album is Detour, released in 2016. It is a country and western album inspired by some of her favourite artists growing up including Patsy Cline. The album peaked at number 29 on the US Billboard 200.

Albums

Studio albums

Broadway cast album

Compilation albums

Extended plays

Singles

As featured artist

B-sides

Video releases

Music videos

Notes

A  Planned for release in 2001 but was shelved due to label going bankrupt. Eventually released as an EP in 2002 and a full album only in Japan.
B  Only released in Canada and Japan.
C  Only released in the Netherlands.
D  Released in Europe, Australia and Japan.
E  Released in North America and Australia.
F  Only released in Europe.
G  Only released in Hong Kong. As an album track, it was able to chart at number 66 on the Tokio Hot 100.
H  Only released in Europe. Later re-released in 1995.
I  Only released in Japan.
J  Only released in the United States.
K  Music video first released in 2017. Single officially released in 2019.

See also
 Blue Angel (band)#Discography

References

External links
 Cyndi Lauper at Discogs
 Cyndi Lauper at AllMusicGuide
 [ Cyndi Lauper] at Billboard

Discographies of American artists
Pop music discographies
Discography